William Maurice Denham OBE (23 December 1909 – 24 July 2002) was an English character actor who appeared in over 100 films and television programmes in his long career.

Family
Denham was born on 23 December 1909 in Beckenham, Kent, the son of Eleanor Winifred (née Lillico) and Norman Denham. He was the third child of four: Norman Keith (1907), Winifred Joan (1908), and Charles (1915).  He was educated at Tonbridge School and trained as a lift engineer. Like fellow actor James Robertson Justice, he played amateur rugby for Beckenham RFC.

In 1936, he married Elizabeth Dunn, with whom he had two sons and a daughter: Christopher (born 1939), Timothy (born 1946) and Virginia (born 1948). Elizabeth died in 1971.

He was awarded the OBE in 1992.  He died on 24 July 2002, aged 92 at Denville Hall in North London.

Career
Denham eventually became an actor in 1934, and appeared in live television broadcasts as early as 1938, continuing to perform in that medium until 1997. 

Denham initially made his name in radio comedy series such as ITMA and Much Binding in the Marsh, which established him as a familiar radio character (providing over sixty different voices, female as well as male, according to a radio interview in November 1988), and later provided all the voices for the animated version of Animal Farm (1954). British Pathé chose him to narrate the voiceover for their 1950's film, 'All in a Day'.
He was nominated for the BAFTA Award for Best Actor in a Leading Role for his performance as Blore in 1954's The Purple Plain. Other film credits include 23 Paces to Baker Street (1956), Night of the Demon (1957), Two-Way Stretch (1960), Sink the Bismarck! (1960), H.M.S. Defiant (1962), Those Magnificent Men in Their Flying Machines (1965), The Day of the Jackal (1973), Minder on the Orient Express (1985) and 84 Charing Cross Road (1987).

Among his television appearances were as the father in Talking to a Stranger (1966), The Lotus Eaters (1972–73), as Archbishop Lang in Edward & Mrs Simpson (1978), Gerrit Dou in Schalcken the Painter (1979), All Passion Spent with Dame Wendy Hiller (1986), as Mr Justice Gwent-Evans in an episode of Rumpole of the Bailey (1987), Behaving Badly (1989), Inspector Morse (1991) and as Sir Max Spence in an episode of Lovejoy ("Benin Bronze", 1992). He also appeared in the Sherlock Holmes story "The Last Vampyre" (1993), with Jeremy Brett starring as Sherlock Holmes. He also appeared (heavily made-up) in another Sherlock Holmes episode, starring Douglas Wilmer as Holmes, "The Retired Colourman", first shown by the BBC in 1965.

He made a guest appearance in the BBC science fiction television series Doctor Who in the 1984 serial The Twin Dilemma, the first story to star Colin Baker in the title role as the sixth Doctor. He later appeared in the Doctor Who radio serial The Paradise of Death in 1993 alongside Jon Pertwee. As The Honourable Mr Justice Stephen Rawley in two episodes in 1977 of the BBC TV prison comedy Porridge, he ends up sharing a cell with Ronnie Barker's Fletcher, whom he had sentenced.

In further radio work, he starred in a BBC Radio 4 version of the Oldest Member, based on stories by P.G. Wodehouse, from 1994 to 1999, as Rumpole in Rumpole: The Splendours and Miseries of an Old Bailey Hack, as Dr. Alexandre Manette in A Tale of Two Cities, as 'Father' in Peter Tinniswood's Winston series, and also as Chief Inspector Jules Maigret in several series beginning in 1976. He also portrayed Hercule Poirot in a BBC radio dramatisation of The Mystery of the Blue Train (1985).

In his book British Film Character Actors (1982), Terence Pettigrew noted that Denham "had one of the best-known bald heads in British films. His face was a minor work of art, a bright-eyed pixie face hand-painted on an egg. It could be kindly, sympathetic, gnomish and infinitely expressive. He also had one of the most listenable and controlled of English-speaking voices, a legacy from his many years in radio."

Selected filmography

 The Man Within (1947) as Smuggler
 The Upturned Glass (1947) as Mobile Policeman
 They Made Me a Fugitive (1947) as Mr Fenshaw
 Holiday Camp (1947) as Camp Doctor
 Jassy (1947) as Jim Stoner
 Captain Boycott (1947) as Lt. Col. StrickLand
 Fame Is the Spur (1947) as Prison Doctor No. 2 (uncredited)
 Take My Life (1947) as Defending Counsel
 The End of the River (1947) as Defending Counsel
 Easy Money (1948) as Detective-Inspector Kirby
 Blanche Fury (1948) as Maj. Fraser
 Escape (1948) as Crown Counsel
 Daybreak (1948) as Inspector
 Miranda (1948) as Cockle Vendor
 Oliver Twist (1948) as Chief of Police
 My Brother's Keeper (1948) as Supt. Trent
 London Belongs to Me (1948) as Jack Rufus
 The Blind Goddess (1948) as Johnson, The Butler
 Quartet (1948) as Coroner (segment "The Allen Corn")
 Here Come the Huggetts (1948) as 1st Engineer
 Look Before You Love (1948) as Fosser
 Once Upon a Dream (1949) as Vicar
 The Blue Lagoon (1949) as Ship Captain
 It's Not Cricket (1949) as Otto Fisch
 A Boy, a Girl and a Bike (1949) as Bill Martin
 Poet's Pub (1949) as PC Windle
 Don't Ever Leave Me (1949) as Mr Knowles
 Madness of the Heart (1949) as Simon Blake
 Landfall (1949) as Wing Cmdr. Hewitt
 The Spider and the Fly (1949) as Colonel de la Roche
 Traveller's Joy (1950) as Fowler
 No Highway (1951) as Major Pearl (uncredited)
 Time Bomb (1953) as Jim Warrilow
 The Net (1953) as Prof. Carrington (uncredited)
 Street Corner (1953) as Mr. Dawson
 Malta Story (1953) as British Officer (uncredited)
 The Million Pound Note (1954) as Jonathan Reid
 Eight O'Clock Walk (1954) as Horace Clifford
 The Purple Plain (1954) as Blore
 Carrington V.C. (1954) as Lt Col Reeve
 Animal Farm (1954) as All Animals (voices)
 Doctor at Sea (1955) as Easter
 Simon and Laura (1955) as Wilson
 23 Paces to Baker Street (1956) as Inspector Grovening
 The Spanish Gardener (1956) as Pedro (voice)
 Checkpoint (1956) as Ted Thornhill
 Barnacle Bill (1957) as Crowley
 Night of the Demon (1957) as Professor Harrington
 The Captain's Table (1959) as Major Broster
 Our Man in Havana (1959) as Admiral
 Two-Way Stretch (1960) as The Governor
 Sink the Bismarck! (1960) as Commander Richards
 The Greengage Summer (1961) as Uncle William
 The Mark (1961) as Arnold Cartwright
 Invasion Quartet (1961) as Dr Barker
 Damn the Defiant (1962) as Mr Goss (Ship's Surgeon)
 The King's Breakfast (1963) as Narrator (voice)
 The Very Edge (1963) as Crawford
 Paranoiac (1963) as John Kossett
 Long Past Glory (TV film) (1963) as Charles
 The 7th Dawn (1964) as Tarlton
 Operation Crossbow (1965) as RAF Officer
 Hysteria (1965) as Hemmings
 Those Magnificent Men in Their Flying Machines (1965) as Trawler Skipper
 The Alphabet Murders (1965) as Japp
 The Nanny (1965) as Dr. Beammaster
 The Heroes of Telemark (1965) as Doctor
 The Uncle (1965) as Mr. Ream
 The Night Caller (1965) as Dr Morley
 After the Fox (1966) as Chief of Interpol
 Jules Verne's Rocket to the Moon (1967) as Narrator (voice, uncredited)
 The Long Duel (1967) as Governor
 Danger Route (1967) as Peter Ravenspur
 Torture Garden (1967) as Uncle Roger (segment 1 "Enoch")
 Attack on the Iron Coast (1968) as Rear Admiral Sir Frederick Grafton
 Negatives (1968) as The Father
 Some Girls Do (1969) as Mr. Mortimer
 Midas Run (1969) as Charles Crittenden
 A Touch of Love (1969) as Doctor Prothero
 The Best House in London (1969) as Editor of The Times
 The Virgin and the Gypsy (1970) as The Rector
 Countess Dracula (1971) as Master Fabio, Castle Historian
 Sunday Bloody Sunday (1971) as Mr Greville
 Nicholas and Alexandra (1971) as Kokovtsov
 The Day of the Jackal (1973) as General Colbert
 Luther (1973) as Johann von Staupitz
 Fall of Eagles (1974) as Kaiser Wilhelm I
 Shout at the Devil (1976) as Mr Smythe
 Julia (1977) as Undertaker 
 Secret Army — Series 1 Episode 14: Good Friday (1977) as Father Girard
 Martin Luther, Heretic (1983) as Father Staupitz
 The Chain (1984) as Grandpa
 Mr Love (1985) as Theo
 84 Charing Cross Road (1987) as George Martin
 Miss Marple — 4.50 from Paddington (1987) as Luther Crackenthorpe
 Inspector Morse (1991) as Lance Mandeville
 Casualty (1997) as Mr Turnbull

References

External links
 
  Maurice Denham's stage performances listed in archive of Theatre Collection University of Bristol

1909 births
2002 deaths
20th-century English male actors
Animal impersonators
English male film actors
English male television actors
English male voice actors
Male actors from Kent
Officers of the Order of the British Empire
People educated at Tonbridge School
People from Beckenham